Huanglongxi (Mandarin: 黄龙溪镇 or 黃龍溪鎮) is a historic Chinese town located in Chengdu, Sichuan. It is named after the Huanglong River, which flows through the town.

The town is over 1,700 years old and has been restored to retain its rustic charm, with ancient cobbled streets, temples, and wharves and houses along its curving alleys. Most of these shops have turned into souvenirs stores.

The majority of the buildings in Huanglongxi date back from the Qing Dynasty. The town features a number of temples and some of the well-known ones include Zhenjiang Temple, Chaoyin Temple and Gulong Temple. It is for this reason that most of the filmmakers choose to shoot exterior scenes of period movies in this town. Temple fairs are organized in Huanglongxi on the ninth day of the sixth and ninth lunar month.

References

External links

Huanglongxi official website

Towns in Sichuan
History of Chengdu
Tourist attractions in Sichuan
Geography of Chengdu